La Classe américaine, also known as Le Grand Détournement (The Great Détournement), is a 1993 French television film, written and directed by Michel Hazanavicius and Dominique Mézerette. It consists exclusively of extracts of old Warner Bros. films, put together and dubbed with new lines so as to create an entirely new film that is a parody of Citizen Kane.

Plot
The film begins with the following lines appearing on screen, complete with deliberate spelling mistakes: "Attention! Ce flim n'est pas un flim sur le cyclimse. Merci de votre compréhension." ("Attention! Thank you for your understanding.")

The story begins with the death of George Abitbol (John Wayne), described as the "Classiest man in the world", somewhere near the fictitious atoll of "Pom Pom Galli" in the "South Pacific" (a place taken from the Wayne movie The Sea Chase). Reporters Dave (Paul Newman), Peter (Dustin Hoffman) and Steven (Robert Redford) investigate his death by going to meet people who knew him during his life in "Tegzas". They mostly investigate his last words: "Monde de merde" (French for "Shitty world").

Cast

Production
Warner Bros. had given the French film and television studio Canal+ Group the rights to use extracts of Warner Bros. films. Hazanavicius and Mézerette set about producing an entire film from cut-and-paste existing footage, and hired the usual French dubbers of John Wayne (Raymond Loyer), Paul Newman (Marc Cassot) and Kirk Douglas (Roger Rudel) to perform the dubbing. La Classe américaine, which lasts seventy-two minutes, incorporates scenes cut from about fifty films, including All the President's Men, Rio Bravo, Band of Angels, The Cheyenne Social Club, Blood Alley, Bullitt, The Candidate, Chisum, The Cowboys, The Crimson Pirate, and When Time Ran Out.

It is the third and last film of a triptych entitled Le Grand Détournement, composed of Derrick contre Superman (September 1992) and Ça détourne (December 1992).

Bibliography

See also
 Dead Men Don't Wear Plaid
John Wayne filmography
 Mozinor
 Guy Debord

References

External links 
 
 Cyclim.se a fan made website attempting to restore the film out of DVD releases
 La Classe américaine on AlloCiné

French parody films
1990s parody films
1993 films
Films directed by Michel Hazanavicius
Parodies of films
1993 comedy films
1990s French films